The 2023 Daytona 500 was a NASCAR Cup Series race and the 65th running of the event. It was held on Sunday, February 19, 2023, at Daytona International Speedway in Daytona Beach, Florida.  It was the first race of the 2023 NASCAR Cup Series. Jimmie Johnson returned to the Cup Series for Legacy Motor Club in this race. This was the longest Daytona 500 in history going 530 miles. 

Ricky Stenhouse Jr., driving for JTG Daugherty Racing, won his first Daytona 500 and third career race after edging out two-time series champion Joey Logano for the lead in front of a multi-car accident on the final lap.

Report
Daytona International Speedway is a race track in Daytona Beach, Florida that is one of six superspeedways, the others being Auto Club Speedway, Pocono Raceway, Indianapolis Motor Speedway, Michigan International Speedway, and Talladega Superspeedway.

Background

Daytona International Speedway is one of three superspeedways to hold NASCAR races, the other two being Atlanta Motor Speedway and Talladega Superspeedway. The track's turns are banked at 31 degrees, while the front stretch, the location of the finish line, is banked at 18 degrees.

Entry list
 (R) denotes rookie driver.
 (W) denotes former winner.
 (i) denotes driver who is ineligible for series driver points.

Qualifying
Kyle Larson earned the outside pole.

Only the top two cars qualify from time trials. The Duels set the lineup for positions 3–38. The first race sets the lineup for cars that qualified in odd-numbered positions on pole qualifying day, while the second race sets the lineup for cars that qualified in even-numbered positions. Only one Open team in each Duel will qualify in this manner. Grid positions 39 and 40 are filled by the two "Open" (teams without a charter) cars that set the fastest times in qualifying, but did not lock in a spot in the Duels.

The fastest two Open team qualifiers were Jimmie Johnson and Travis Pastrana which earned them a spot in the race regardless of the outcome of the Duels.

Qualifying results

Bluegreen Vacations Duel

The Bluegreen Vacations Duels are a pair of NASCAR Cup Series races held in conjunction with the Daytona 500 annually in February at Daytona International Speedway. They consist of two races 60 laps and 150 miles (240 km) in length, which serve as heat races that set the lineup for the Daytona 500. Both races sets the lineup for positions 3–38. The first race sets the lineup for cars that qualified in odd–numbered positions on pole qualifying day with exceptions based on open teams. The second race sets the lineup for cars that qualified in even–numbered positions. Only the top finishing open car will transfer from each qualifying race.  After qualifying races, the final two positions are determined by fastest times in qualifying of open teams that did not advance.

Duel 1

Duel 1 results

Duel 2

Duel 2 results

Starting lineup

Practice

First practice

Final practice

Race
The race began with Alex Bowman and Kyle Larson on the front row, The next few laps Larson and Bowman exanged the lead.

10 laps in and the inside line began to prevail, with Larson, Logano, and Bell making up the top 3 of the field. Bell changes lines, side drafts and starts leading the outside line. 13 laps and there are 40 cars with 2.7 seconds of separation between the 1st and the last one. Lap 21 and the inside line starts to gain strength too, with Logano pushing Larson. A third line was created with Bubba Wallace, Tyler Reddick and Justin Haley, but it did not last long. Then the race was back to 2 racing lines with Bell still leading on the outside and Larson on the inside.

Smoke comes out of Ty Dillon's car on lap 28. His team pushes him to the garage, and they figure out that Dillon has an engine problem, making him the first driver to retire from the race.

Between lap 37 and 40 the drivers make their first pit stops. On lap 38 there was a spin by rookie Riley Herbst, however Nascar did not throw the yellow. After that, Denny Hamlin remains as leader, followed by Bell and Reddick, but Chase Briscoe takes the lead on lap 42.

Two lines are formed again. On the inside are Briscoe, Wallace and Almirola, and on the outside Hamlin, Bell and Reddick. On lap 55, Bubba Wallace was leading, but hit the back straight wall, after a push from Hamlin to Martin Truex Jr. who touches Wallace's #23 sending him into the wall

As the laps go by 1 racing line forms. Truex Jr., Hamlin, Gibbs, Almirola and Keselowski lead the top 5.

On lap 64, two laps from the end of the first stage, A. J. Allmendinger, who was one lap behind the leader, hinders the inside line of Aric Almirola and Jimmie Johnson, with the intention of overtaking Herbst, and get in the position to have the Free Pass and be on the lead lap

Then, on the last lap of stage 1, Brad Keselowski manages with the push of Ryan Preece, to pass the leading Toyota of Hamlin and Truex. He is followed by Chris Buescher and Kevin Harvick, while Truex slows down the outside line.

The first stage ends and Brad Keselowski finishes first, scoring 10 points for the championship, followed by Ryan Preece, who tried to pass the Keselowski  on the last lap. Chris Buescher, Kevin Harvick, Michael McDowell, Ty Gibbs, Jimmie Johnson, Martin Truex Jr. and Todd Gilliland round out the top 10.

The race restarts on lap 72, with Preece leading on the inside and Keselowski on the outside. Keselowski drops to the inside, with Almirola taking the lead on the outside. By lap 84, the inside line begins to prevail with Keselowski, Preece, Harvick and McDowell, with 7 Fords in the top 10. Martin Truex Jr. and Kyle Busch move to lead the outside line on lap 94, but it has no effect.

After another sequence of pit stops, a three side by side appears on lap 112, with Joey Logano and Ryan Blaney leading the race, the latter being the one who blocked the pack of Toyotas twice. On lap 117 there were 2 well organized racing lines, with Chris Buescher leading on the outside, when the first of multiple accidents occurs on the following lap. Kevin Harvick touches Tyler Reddick who involved Ryan Blaney, Erik Jones, Kyle Larson, Chase Elliott, Martin Truex Jr. and Daniel Suarez. Jones, Reddick, and Elliott drop out of the race, while Blaney received repairs on his right front.

The leaders take advantage of the pit stops, Cindric and Hamlin pit for 2 tires while every body else takes 4. The race restarts on lap 126, with a group of drivers preferring track position and stage points. Logano leads with a push from Truex Jr. on the inside, while Bowman pushes Chastain on the outside.

Ross Chastain gets down to take the lead from Logano. He begins to block both lines, while Bowman is strong on the outside line with a push from Ricky Stenhouse Jr. Chastain wins  the second stage due to the push from Truex and Logano, in a photo finish against Alex Bowman. Closing the top 10, Logano, Stenhouse Jr., Austin Cindric, Truex Jr., Byron, Allmendinger, Buescher, and Bell.

During the yellow flag at the end of the second stage, pit stops take place, with Chastain almost stalling the car. He then exceeds the speed limit and is penalized with a drive-through. The same penalty for Bell due to passing over equipment, and for Gragson due to an uncontrolled tire.

Wallace stays out of the pits and takes the lead of the race. The race returns to the green flag on lap 138 with Bubba starting well, protecting both lines, but Buescher pushes Almirola, putting the #10 in the lead. The inside line is consolidated, when the yellow flag comes out on lap 140, because a front right tread came off the #12 of Ryan Blaney in turn 2.

Then on the lap 143 restart Almirola was strong on the inside line, but Buescher was pushing very well. Bubba gets in the middle, losing draft, so he had to go on the inside. Cindric almost lost control of his car, making a good save, he was ahead of Preece. On lap 145, Buescher moves to command the outside line with a push from teammate and co-owner Keselowski. Three laps in, the two make it a 1-2 for RFK commanding the inside line. Both move to the outside line with Hamlin and LaJoie attacking on the inside. Strong push from #7 to #11 to fight off the Fords.

Laps go by and the inside line can't make any progress with Denny Hamlin, Corey LaJoie and Justin Haley commanding the Ford brand in the top six positions. On lap 157, Suarez leads the inside line, along with Larson and Jimmie Johnson, but then Suarez had to move up the line, because otherwise he runs out of draft. Earlier there was a touch from #11 of Denny Hamlin to #99 in the middle of turn 1. With 38 laps to go, LaJoie now leads the inside line, with Justin Haley's push.

Harrison Burton loses out on the inside, but now leads the outside line. Bubba Wallace didn't get the yellow flag he needed and had to go for fuel with 30 laps to go. He will do it unaccompanied by anyone and two laps later the leaders take a lap off of him.

Between laps 176 and 180 the drivers stop in the pits to make their last stops. After the pit stop cycle, Harrison Burton and Joey Logano lead the race. Stenhouse Jr. is penalized for speeding, having to make a drive-through on lap 180. With 18 laps to go, the first Big One takes place, with many Fords involved. Ryan Preece loses control when he receives a push from McDowell and clobbered the outside wall before involving Kevin Harvick, Martin Truex Jr., Chase Briscoe, and Jimmie Johnson

The race restarts with 14 laps to go, with Burton leading on the outside with a push from Kyle Busch, and Logano on the inside with a push from Byron. The inside line works, Logano almost loses the car on the main straight. Logano was left on the outside, losing the draft, before a maneuver from A. J. Allmendinger. The Kaulig driver leads the race until he looses the lead from Brad Keselowski with 10 laps to go.

As the laps went by, the RFK cars and the Richard Childress Racing cars remained close each other. With four laps to go, the RCR drivers coordinated with Byron on the back straight to pass Keselowski and Buescher, and Kyle Busch was in the lead, looking for his first Daytona 500 victory in his 18th attempt. But on the next lap, Daniel Suarez gets a touch from Jimmie Johnson, spinning at the exit of turn 4, and with this the race went to the first overtime.

After radio communications on how to take advantage of having his two cars in the first two positions, RCR decided Austin Dillon slow the inside line on the restart, to protect Kyle Busch, who immediately switched to that line, commanding a 1-2 for RCR. However, the inside line would lose pace with Joey Logano and Ricky Stenhouse Jr. passing both cars.  On the back straight, Stenhouse, with a push from Larson, passed Logano, and second later the yellow flag was waved for another Big One, caused by Byron's touch on Austin Dillon who spun up the track collecting Austin Cindric, Todd Gilliland, Harrison Burton, Noah Gragson, Zane Smith, Denny Hamlin and Jimmie Johnson.

RFK Racing drivers come in for fuel, in case the race continues to extend and several drivers have to pit. Riley Herbst and Aric Almirola, also pit.

The race restarts for a second overtime on lap 210, with Stenhouse leading on the outside and Larson on the inside. Stenhouse gets enough of a lead coming to the white flag, and blocks the inside line, leaving Larson without a draft. In Turn 2, Travis Pastrana dumped Larson, creating the third Big One with Keselowski, Almirola, Kyle Busch, Wallace, Allmendinger and Hamlin involved, and the yellow flag was quickly waved.

Nascar had then had to check video to find out who won. Nascar determined that Ricky Stenhouse Jr, the JTG Daugherty Racing driver, was the winner of the 65th Daytona 500

Race results

Stage Results

Stage One
Laps: 65

Stage Two
Laps: 65

Final Stage Results

Stage Three
Laps: 70

Race statistics
 Lead changes: 52 among 21 different drivers
 Cautions/Laps: 8 for 38 laps
 Red flags: 0
 Time of race: 3 hours, 38 minutes and 53 seconds
 Average speed:

Media

Television

Since 2001—with the exception of 2002, 2004 and 2006—the Daytona 500 has been carried by Fox in the United States. The booth crew consists of longtime NASCAR lap-by-lap announcer Mike Joy, Clint Bowyer, and three-time NASCAR Cup Series champion and co-owner of Stewart-Haas Racing Tony Stewart. Jamie Little, Regan Smith and Josh Sims handled pit road for the television side. 1992 and 1998 Daytona 500 winning crew chief Larry McReynolds provided insight from the Fox Sports studio in Charlotte.

Radio
The race was broadcast on radio by the Motor Racing Network who has covered the Daytona 500 since 1970—and simulcast on Sirius XM NASCAR Radio. The booth crew consists of Alex Hayden, Jeff Striegle, and 1989 Cup Series champion Rusty Wallace. Longtime turn announcer Dave Moody was the lead turn announcer, calling the race from atop the Sunoco tower outside the exit of turn 2 when the field races through turns 1 and 2. Mike Bagley works the backstretch for the race from a spotter's stand on the inside of the track & Kyle Rickey called the race when the field races through turns 3 and 4 from the Sunoco tower outside the exit of turn 4. On pit road, MRN was operated by Steve Post, Kim Coon, Brienne Pedigo and Dillon Welch.

Standings after the race

Drivers' Championship standings

Manufacturers' Championship standings

 Note: Only the first 16 positions are included for the driver standings.

Notes

References

Daytona 500
Daytona 500
Daytona 500
NASCAR races at Daytona International Speedway